Düztahir (also, Dustair and Dyuztair) is a village and municipality in the Qusar Rayon of Azerbaijan.  It has a population of 1,555.

References 

Populated places in Qusar District